Rewind Racers is a steel shuttle family roller coaster at Adventure City in Stanton, California. The attraction replaced the vintage Tree Top Racers, which had closed in 2012, and opened on June 6, 2015. Upon opening, it became the first family shuttle coaster in North America, and remains a unique attraction in the United States today.

History
During the latter half of 2012, Adventure City's larger of their two roller coasters, Tree Top Racers, was closed and permanently retired. The coaster was a vintage Miler Manufacturing wild mouse style attraction, which had opened in 1958 and was operated by Midway Amusements in Brisbane, Australia, before being sold to Adventure City in 1999. The attraction had been given a major refurbishment upon its purchase that saw the installation of modern hardware, but by the 2010s it had finally succumbed to old age and was shut, standing idle during 2013 before being dismantled. The park had actively begun looking for a replacement.

On February 24, 2014, Rewind Racers was announced as the park's largest investment in two decades at a cost of $2 million USD, with a set opening date of summer 2014. The coaster would become the first family shuttle coaster in North America, and accommodate riders as short as 39". This never came to be, and the coaster's opening was delayed to 2015, with construction beginning in September 2014. The attraction layout was completed by the end of the year, and station work progressed throughout early 2015. After months of landscaping, testing, and further preparation, Rewind Racers opened to the public on June 6, 2015.

A shed structure with additional thematic elements was meant to be installed the year after Rewind Racer's opening; however, this didn't materialize until early 2020.

Characteristics

Statistics
The coaster is serviced by a single 14 passenger train, which has 7 cars with a single two-person row each. 

Rewind Racers is also a Shuttle roller coaster, in which the track does not form a full circuit and as a result the train traverses part of its track at least once more during the ride, often backwards. The closest example of another shuttle coaster is Montezooma's Revenge at Knott's Berry Farm.

Contractors
Rewind Racers was manufactured by Gerstlauer, a roller coaster firm who would later go on to produce the well-regarded HangTime at Knott's Berry Farm in 2018, just a few miles away. Ride Entertainment Group, who manages all of Gerstlauer's sales and projects in the Western Hemisphere, was also involved. R&R Creative Amusement Designs, an Anaheim-based design firm who had collaborated with Adventure City in the past, also designed the ride's soap box racers theme as well as the station and queue.

Ride experience
A voice over the loudspeakers signals the ride to start, and the train speeds down the lift and through the station towards Starr St. A tight left-hand turnaround ensues, followed by a quick airtime bump and a clockwise helix over the park's pathway and Express Train. Riders ascend a short drive tire lift parallel to the first before parking into the shed once again. As the voice once again tells riders that they are falling behind in the race and must catch up, the train is pushed back and traverses the layout backwards. The train swings back into the lift hill before coming to a complete stop in the station.

References

External links
Rewind Racers at Gerstlauer

Roller coasters in California
2015 establishments in California